Jardim de Piranhas is a municipality in the state of Rio Grande do Norte in the Northeast region of Brazil.

According to accounts, in the city in the 19th century, cowboys were crossing the Piranhas River with their cattle in high season, the river known for containing the piranha fish, desperate made a promise to Nossa Senhora dos Aflitos, who managed to cross the river with their cattle. , they would build a chapel in honor of Nossa Senhora dos Aflitos and three so the cattle and their cattle crossing the piranhas river. Some time after that, a very rich woman from the region called Margarida Cardoso Cavalcante donated land for the construction of the chapel of Nossa Senhora dos Aflitos, thus creating a village that was named Jardim de Piranhas for having emerged on Fazenda Jardim and located on the banks of the river. Piranhas River. With the gradual growth, Jardim de Piranhas moved to the district of Caicó, in 1936. And on December 23, 1948, by Law number 146, Jardim de Piranhas was dismembered from Caicó and elevated to the category of the state of Rio Grande in the municipality of Norte. .

See also
List of municipalities in Rio Grande do Norte

References

Municipalities in Rio Grande do Norte